Vasum, common name the vase snails or vase shells, is a genus of mostly rather large predatory sea snails, marine gastropod mollusks in the subfamily Vasinae within the family Turbinellidae.

Shell description
Shells of species in this genus are usually somewhat large, and are usually very thick and heavy. They are often vase-shaped, in the sense that the shell of most of the species is more or less widely conical. The shells have a thick periostracum, a low spires, and 2, 3 or 4 plaits on the columella.

The shell is oval, oblong, solid, tubercular or spinose, with spinose fascicles below. The spire is short. The apex is not papillary. The aperture is oblong. The siphonal canal is short and somewhat recurved. The columella contains  several transverse folds in the middle. The outer lip is thickened and sinuous. 

The animal (of Vasum) is slow-moving, timid and inactive, shrinking quickly within the shell on the slightest alarm. The operculum is ovate, acute, with an apical nucleus; it is very thick, claw-like, and partially free at the hind part. The dentition resembles somewhat that of the Buccinidae, differing in the lateral teeth; it differs widely from the Nassidae, and quite as much from that of the Fasciolariidae

Distribution
Species of this genus are circumtropical; also off Australia (Northern Territory, Queensland, Western Australia)

Species
Species within the genus Vasum include:

 † Vasum aedificatum Guppy 1876 
 † Vasum aquitanicum Peyrot, 1928 
 Vasum armatum (Broderip, 1833)
 Vasum caestus (Broderip, 1833)
 † Vasum cancellatum (Grateloup, 1845) 
 Vasum capitellum (Linnaeus, 1758)
 Vasum cassiforme (Kiener, 1840)
 Vasum ceramicum (Linnaeus, 1758)
 Vasum crosseanum (Souverbie, 1875)
 † Vasum dominicense Gabb 1873 
 † Vasum elongatum Vokes 1970
 † Vasum floridanum T. L. McGinty, 1940 
 †  Vasum frequens (Mayer-Eymar, 1895)
 Vasum globulus (Lamarck, 1816)
 † Vasum gurabicum Maury 1917 
 † Vasum haitensis Sowerby 1850 
  † Vasum intermedium (Grateloup, 1832)
 Vasum lactisfloris Ferrario, 1983
 Vasum latiriforme Rehder & Abbott, 1951
 Vasum muricatum (Born, 1778)
 † Vasum omanicum Harzhauser, 2007 
 † Vasum pufferi Emerson 1964 
 † Vasum pugnus Pilsbry and Johnson 1917 
 Vasum rhinoceros (Gmelin, 1791)
 Vasum stephanti Emerson & Sage, 1988
 † Vasum subpugillare (d'Orbigny, 1852) 
 † Vasum suwanneensis Petuch 1997
 † Vasum tribulosum Vokes 1970
 Vasum truncatum (Sowerby III, 1892)
 † Vasum tuberculatum Gabb 1873  
 Vasum tubiferum (Anton, 1838)
 Vasum turbinellus (Linnaeus, 1758)

Species brought into synonymy
 Vasum aldridgei Nowell-Usticke, 1969: synonym of Attiliosa aldridgei (Nowell-Usticke, 1969)
 Vasum antiguaensis Usticke, 1971: synonym of Vasum globulus (Lamarck, 1816)
 † Vasum basilicum Bellardi 1872: synonym of † Melongena basilica (Bellardi, 1873)
Vasum cassidiformis Kiener, 1845: synonym of Vasum cassiforme (Kiener, 1840)
 Vasum castaneum Röding, 1798: synonym of Thais (Thalessa) tuberosa (Röding, 1798)
 † Vasum excrenatum Sacco, 1904: synonym of † Vasum cancellatum (Grateloup, 1845) 
 Vasum flindersi Verco, 1914: synonym of Altivasum flindersi (Verco, 1914)
 † Vasum quirosense F. Hodson, 1931: synonym of † Vasum haitensis Sowerby, 1850 
 Vasum nigra G. Perry, 1811: synonym of Vasum turbinellus (Linnaeus, 1758)
 Vasum nigricans G. Perry, 1811: synonym of Vasum turbinellus (Linnaeus, 1758)
 Vasum rubescens G. Perry, 1811: synonym of Vasum capitellum (C. Linnaeus, 1758)
 Vasum spinosus G. Fischer von Waldheim, 1807 : synonym of Vasum ceramicum (C. Linnaeus, 1758)
 † Vasum stephanense Peyrot, 1928 : synonym of † Vasum cancellatum (Grateloup, 1845) †
 Vasum triangulare (E. A. Smith, 1902): synonym of Vasum truncatum triangulare (E. A. Smith, 1902)
 Vasum turbinellum [sic]: synonym of Vasum turbinellus (Linnaeus, 1758)
 Vasum urna Röding, 1798: synonym of Vasum muricatum (Born, 1778)
 Vasum variolaris J.B.P.A. Lamarck, 1822: synonym of Vasum turbinellus (Linnaeus, 1758)

References

 W. Wenz. 1938. Handbuch der Paläozoologie; Gastropoda. Handbuch der Paläozoologie
 J. R. Gardner. 1947. The Molluscan Fauna of the Alum Bluff Group of Florida. United States Geological Survey Professional Paper (142A-H)1-709
 Rehder H.A. & Abbott R.T. (1951). Some new and interesting mollusks from the deeper waters of the Gulf of Mexico. Revista de la Sociedad Malacologica "Carlos de la Torre". 8(2): 53-66, pls 8-9.
 B. Wilson. 1994. Australian Marine Shells 2
 E. J. Petuch. 1997. A new gastropod fauna from an Oligocene back-reef lagoonal environment in west central Florida. The Nautilus 110(4):122-138
 J. A. Todd. 2001. Systematic list of gastropods in the Panama Paleontology Project collections.
 J. J. Sepkoski. 2002. A compendium of fossil marine animal genera. Bulletins of American Paleontology 363:1-560
 M. Harzhauser. 2007. Oligocene and Aquitanian gastropod faunas from the Sultanate of Oman and their biogeographic implications for the western Indo-Pacific. Palaeontographica Abteilung A 280:75-121
 B. Landau and C. Marques da Silva. 2010. Early Pliocene gastropods of Cubagua, Venezuela: Taxonomy, palaeobiogeography and ecostratigraphy. Palaeontos 19:1-221

External links

  Röding, P. F. (1798). Museum Boltenianum sive Catalogus cimeliorum e tribus regnis naturæ quæ olim collegerat Joa. Fried Bolten, M. D. p. d. per XL. annos proto physicus Hamburgensis. Pars secunda continens Conchylia sive Testacea univalvia, bivalvia & multivalvia. Trapp, Hamburg. viii, 199 pp
 Schumacher, C. F. (1817). Essai d'un nouveau système des habitations des vers testacés. Schultz, Copenghagen. iv + 288 pp., 22 pls
 Perry G. (1810-1811). Arcana: or the Museum of Natural History. pls. 1-48 (= 1810), pls. 49-84 (= 1811), unnumbered text pages. London: James Stratford
  Swainson, W. (1835). The elements of modern conchology. Baldwin & Cradock, London, 62 pp
  Abbott, R. T. (1959). The family Vasidae in the Indo-Pacific. Indo-Pacific Mollusca. 1 (1): 15-32
 Abbott R.T.(1950) - The Genera Xancus and Vasum in the Western Atlantic; Johnsonia v. 2 19-32
  Vokes, Emily H. "The age of the Baitoa Formation, Dominican Republic, using Mollusca for correlation." Tulane Studies in Geology and Paleontology 15.4 (1979): 105-116.

Turbinellidae